Ojo Caliente may mean:

Populated places 
 Ojo Caliente, New Mexico, a community in Taos County, New Mexico
 Ojocaliente, Zacatecas, a medium-sized town in Mexico

Other 
 Ojo Caliente (Socorro County, New Mexico), a spring in the Monticello Canyon
 Ojo Caliente Hot Springs, a hot spring system in New Mexico